The John Darlington Building is the oldest commercial building in Quebec City, Quebec, Canada. Located at 7 Rue de Buade, at its junction with Rue du Fort, it was built in 1775 for merchant tailor John Darlington.Review of Historical Publications Relating to Canada, Volumes 3-4 (1899) – Google Books

Gallery

References

External links
Maison Darlington - official website

Buildings and structures in Quebec City
1775 establishments in the British Empire
Commercial buildings in Quebec